Ad. Aileu or Associação Desportiva Aileu is a football club of East Timor from Aileu. The team plays in the Taça Digicel.

References

Football clubs in East Timor
Football
Aileu Municipality
Association football clubs established in 2010
2010 establishments in East Timor